The Knights Templar was a medieval Christian military order prominent in the Crusades, from the early 12th century until the early 14th century.

Knights Templar or Knight Templar may also refer to:
Knights Templar (Freemasonry)
The Knights Templar (Deus Ex), a fictional organization in the Deus Ex series
Knight Templar (The Saint), a 1930 novel by Leslie Charteris
The Knights Templar School, a school in Baldock, England
Knights Templar Cartel, a drug cartel in Mexico
Knight Templar, a Marvel Comics superhero in Marvel: The Lost Generation

See also
Anders Behring Breivik, a terrorist who claimed, apparently falsely, to be a member of a group called the Knights Templar
Grand Masters of the Knights Templar
History of the Knights Templar
Knights Templar in popular culture
List of Knights Templar
List of Knights Templar sites
Militia Templi, a present-day Catholic lay association.
Royal Order of Scotland
Sovereign Military Order of the Temple of Jerusalem,  Knights Templar International (OSMTH-KTI)
Templar (disambiguation)
Trials of the Knights Templar